Jabulani Hadebe (born 2 December 1983), known professionally as Sjava, is a South African singer, rapper, and actor. He began his acting career in 2005, starring in several drama series and films including uGugu no Andile (2009). He then rose to prominence on the drama series Zone 14, where he starred for three consecutive seasons ,Isibaya and the second season of Ehostela . Sjava ventured into the music industry and signed to record label Ambitiouz Entertainment. He gained mainstream popularity after he was featured on Miss Pru's acclaimed song "Ameni" in 2015.

Sjava's debut album, Isina Muva (2016), introduced his experimental sound which fuses afrobeats, hip hop and contemporary R&B. His second studio album, Umqhele, was released in 2018 to a critical acclaim. Umqhele, which continues with his fusion sound, grew his African-influenced image, and consolidated to other international regions (mainly in Africa). Before Umqhele, Sjava also released his debut EP, Umphako, in 2018.

Life and career
Jabulani Hadebe was born in Bergville, KwaZulu-Natal, the son of Thandi Nkabinde (his mother). He is of Hlubi ancestry. Sjava has two older siblings, Sibusiso (his brother) and Sindy (his sister).

Sjava started writing music at an early age. While at the age of ten, Sjava was in charge of writing original lyrics on songs for his all-boy isicathamiya group Abafana baseMpumalanga, while in primary school. He then took composition of music a step further in high school, where he used to turn notes into songs, then teach them to his classmates.

Music

2016–2017: Beginnings and Isina Muva
Sjava's debut recording was a feature on DJ and producer Miss Pru's "Ameni". The successful song also featured then-artists of record label Ambitiouz Entertainment; Emtee, Fifi Cooper, B3nchmarq, and Saudi – who is currently in the label.

On 8 April 2016, he released his debut single as a solo artist, "Ekuseni". He then released his debut album, Isina Muva on 22 July 2016. Its title is derived from a Zulu idiom meaning "late bloomer". Isina Muva was certified Gold by the Recording Industry of South Africa (RiSA) and Sjava celebrated by releasing a deluxe version of the album titled Isina Muva: Gold Deluxe The album earned Sjava an award at the 23rd South African Music Awards for Best Produced Album. It also won for a similar category at the 16th Metro FM Music Awards, and received four nominees: Best Afro Pop Album for Isina Muva, Best Male and Best New Artist. Also in 2017, Sjava recorded the theme song for the Mzansi Magic drama telenovela Isithembiso, which premiered on 3 April 2017.

2017– 2019: Umphako and Umqhele

The film Black Panther was accompanied by a soundtrack album curated by rapper Kendrick Lamar, which Sjava appeared on. Sjava was featured on the song "Seasons", alongside rappers Mozzy and a TDE rapper Reason. The album was nominated at the 61st Annual Grammy Awards for Album of the Year, making it his first nominee at the ceremony for his appearance.

The lead single from Sjava's debut EP Umpakho, "Abangani" featuring Saudi and Emtee was released on 14 June 2018 accompanied by a video paying homage to their humble beginnings. On 24 June 2018, Sjava earned a BET Award for Best New International Act at the 2018 event. Umphako was released on 6 July 2018. The four-track project atopped the iTunes local chart on its first day, and is described as Sjava asserting himself as an empathetic worker's champion.

Sjava's second studio album Umqhele was released on 14 December 2018. The album's lead single "Umama", was released seven days before the album was available. "Umama" later spawned a version on the global music platform COLORS, where he was featured performing the song on 13 May 2019. Umqhele atopped the iTunes local chart and received positive reviews from critics.

On November 23, 2019, Sjava bagged Best Male Artist in Southern Africa  award at 2019 All Africa Music Awards.

On 26 May 2020, Sjava announced via social media that he has departed his label, Ambitiouz Entertainment. He expressed gratitude towards the label for giving him an "opportunity and platform when no one did".

2020-present: 1020 Cartel, Umsebenzi EP, Isibuko 
Following departure with Ambitiouz Entertainment, Sjava self signed to his record deal  1020 Cartel and released his Extended Play  Umsebenzi on December 14, 2020. The EP was certified with gold plaque.

In December 2022, he announced his third studio album Isibuko, which was released January 27, 2023. It features guests such as Shwi, Saudi, Emtee, Sampa the Great, Delayde, Lolli Native, Qwabe Twins, Umzukulu, Umzulu Phaqa, Udumakahle, Anzo, Vernotile, Inkos' Yamagcokama, and Nontokozo Mkhize.

Television
From 2005 to 2013, Sjava enrolled to acting. He appeared on several television shows; including Zone 14, Generations and Soul City and 7de Laan,  uGugu and Andile, Isibaya. In August 2020, he landed  on a small role  on Uzalo and eHostela Season 2.Discography
Studio albums

Extended plays

Awards and nominations

 All Africa Music Awards 

!
|-
|2021
|Himself
|Best Male Artist in African Inspirational Music
|
|

Metro FM Music Awards

|-
|rowspan="4"|2017
|rowspan="4"|Isina Muva
|Best Male
|
|-
|Best New Artist
|
|-
|Best Afro Pop Album
|
|-
|Best Produced Album
|

South African Music Awards

|-
|2017
|Isina Muva
|Best Produced Album
|
|-
|rowspan="4" | 2019
|Umqhele
|Album of the Year
|
|-
|Himself
|Male Artist of the Year
|
|-
|rowspan="2" | Umqhele
|Best Engineered Album of the Year
|
|-
|Best Afro Pop Album
|
|-
|2021
|Umsebenzi
|Best Adult Contemporary Album
|

 South African Traditional Music Awards 

!
|-
|2021
|Umsebenzi''
|Best Male Artist/Group
|
|

DSTV Mzansi Viewers' Choice Awards

|-
|2017
|Himself
|Rising Star
|

BET Awards

|-
|2018
|Himself
|Best New International Act
|

References

1983 births
Living people
South African singer-songwriters
People from KwaZulu-Natal
Soul musicians
South African rhythm and blues musicians
21st-century South African male singers
People from Okhahlamba Local Municipality